Michele Matsikoudis is an American Republican Party politician who represents the 21st legislative district in the New Jersey General Assembly since she took office on January 11, 2022. She previously served on the New Providence Borough Council.

New Jersey General Assembly
Matsikoudis was one of a record seven new Republican Assemblywomen elected in the 2021 general election, joining seven Republican women incumbents who won re-election that year to the Assembly and Senate.

Committee assignments 
Committee assignments for the 2022—23 Legislative Session session are:
Community Development and Affairs
Education
Aging and Senior Services
Joint Committee on the Public Schools

District 21 
Each of the 40 districts in the New Jersey Legislature has one representative in the New Jersey Senate and two members in the New Jersey General Assembly. The representatives from the 21st District for the 2022—23 Legislative Session are:
 Senator Jon Bramnick (R)
 Assemblyman Michele Matsikoudis (R)
 Assemblyman Nancy Munoz (R)

References

External links
Legislative webpage

Living people
New Jersey city council members
Republican Party members of the New Jersey General Assembly
People from New Providence, New Jersey
Politicians from Union County, New Jersey
Women state legislators in New Jersey
21st-century American politicians
21st-century American women politicians
Year of birth missing (living people)